"Naked" is the title track and second single from Marques Houston's second album of the same name.  It's the fifth track on the album.  The remix for "Naked" features Mike Jones.

The single was another hit on the Billboard Hot 100 for Houston, peaking at number forty-seven. It was the biggest hit single from the album of the same name. 
This was Houston's second single not to be released in the U.K.

Music video
The video is reminiscent of D'Angelo's Untitled (How Does It Feel). The video was edited to be aired on BET and other networks. An uncut version can be viewed on the internet. The video shows Marques with his female partner in bed and also in the bathtub - nude. There are also some scenes with Marques standing and singing (with his crotch just below the camera).

Charts

Weekly charts

Year-end charts

References

2005 singles
Marques Houston songs
Contemporary R&B ballads
2005 songs
Song recordings produced by the Underdogs (production team)
The Ultimate Group singles
Songs written by Tank (American singer)
Songs written by Antonio Dixon (songwriter)
Songs written by Harvey Mason Jr.
Songs written by Damon Thomas (record producer)